If We Only Knew is a 1913 American drama film directed by  D. W. Griffith and starring Blanche Sweet.

Plot
A wealthy couple leave their young child with a nanny while they attend a social event.  While under the care of the nanny, the child wanders off into the yard and strolls down to the beach with her doll and gets into a boat.  The boat drifts away out to sea and the girl is rescued by nearby fishermen who take her to their humble shack.  Meanwhile, the nanny who was reading a book realizes the child’s disappearance and alerts the parents. When the parents arrive they find only the child’s bonnet and the doll’s stroller near the beach and assume the child had drowned.

Cast
 Henry B. Walthall as The Father
 Blanche Sweet as The Mother
 Harry Carey as The Sailor
 William Courtright as The Minister

See also
 Harry Carey filmography
 D. W. Griffith filmography
 Blanche Sweet filmography

References

External links

1913 films
Films directed by D. W. Griffith
1913 short films
American silent short films
Biograph Company films
American black-and-white films
1913 drama films
Silent American drama films
1910s American films
1910s English-language films